The Anglian Tower is the lower portion of an Early Medieval tower on the city walls of York in the English county of North Yorkshire. It is located on the south-west (interior) face of the City walls, currently in the grounds of York City Library and accessible on foot both from there and the Museum Gardens.

Discovery
The Anglian tower was first discovered by workmen making a tunnel from St Leonard's Place to Mint Yard in 1839. It was probably located again in 1934 by the City Engineer. The location of the tower places it between the conjectural locations of two Roman interval towers on the south-west side of the Roman fortress.

Function
There is no secular parallel for this tower in Britain, nor in Europe. It could not be directly dated, and the most likely dates for its construction are the mid-7th century or mid-9th century. The function of the tower is also problematic. Two doorways at the base were designed to allow a sentry to walk through behind the stump of the Roman fortress wall, and there is no evidence to suggest that the tower chamber had any function other than to allow free access along the walls. The form and function of the upper part of the tower cannot be known. It may have served as a watchtower, a platform for archers or artillery, but there is no surviving evidence to substantiate any of these. The position of the tower might imply the existence of others.

Visible remains
It is a small square tower, built of stone with arched doorways and tunnel-vaulted. The remains stand to a height of over three metres, abutting up against the later Medieval City Wall.

A descriptive plaque on the Tower stated:

This building is the lower storey of a tower built into a breach in the 4th-century Roman fortress wall perhaps in the reign of King Edwin (616 - 632 AD). It was hidden under the Danish and later ramparts and rediscovered in 1839.

A second plaque commemorated the death of archaeologist Jeffrey Radley in 1970:
This plaque is erected to the memory of Jeffrey Radley M.A. F.S.A. who carried out the excavation of the tower and was tragically killed in a subsequent accident at the site on July 22nd 1970.

See also
 Anglo-Saxon England
 Northumbria
 Yorkshire Museum

References

Bibliography
Barbara Wilson and Frances Mee, The City Walls and Castles of York: The Pictorial Evidence, York Archaeological Trust, 2005.  .
Buckland, P. C. 1984. 'The 'Anglian Tower' and the use of Jurassic limestone in York' in Addyman, P. V. & Black, V. E. (eds), Archaeological papers from York presented to M W Barley, York: York Archaeological Trust. pp. 51–57.

External links
 City Walls info at City of York Council website
 Detailed Walking Tour of York Walls.
 The Walls theme on the History of York website
 An in depth audio guide for the Walls

Buildings and structures completed in the 9th century
Standing Anglo-Saxon buildings
Grade I listed buildings in York
Grade I listed towers
Towers in North Yorkshire
Towers completed in the 9th century